John Barla is an Indian politician. He was elected to the Lok Sabha, lower house of the Parliament of India from Alipurduars, West Bengal in the 2019 Indian general election as a member of the Bharatiya Janata Party. Since 7 July 2021, he is serving as the Union Minister of State in the Ministry of Minority Affairs.

Political career
He used to work in the tea gardens of Alipurduar district at the age of 14. After that, he started to raise the voice for the welfare of the tea workers. In May 2019, in the 2019 Lok Sabha election, he defeated Dasrath Tirkey of All India Trinamool Congress by more than 2 lakh votes from Alipurduar. On 8 July 2021, he was made the Minister of State for Minority Affairs during the cabinet reshuffle in the Narendra Modi cabinet.

References

External links
 Official biographical sketch in Parliament of India website

India MPs 2019–present
Lok Sabha members from West Bengal
Living people
Bharatiya Janata Party politicians from West Bengal
1975 births
People from Alipurduar